List of schools in Ireland may refer to:

 List of schools in Northern Ireland
 List of schools in the Republic of Ireland

See also
 List of Catholic schools in Ireland by religious order